The Bainbridge Island Japanese American Exclusion Memorial (Beinburijjitō Nikkei Amerikajin Haijo Kinenhi) is an outdoor exhibit commemorating the internment of Japanese Americans from Bainbridge Island in the state of Washington. It is located on the south shore of Eagle Harbor, opposite the town of Winslow. Administratively, it is a unit of the Minidoka National Historic Site in Idaho. The mission of the memorial is Nidoto Nai Yoni, “Let It Not Happen Again”.

Background

Japanese immigrants first came to Bainbridge Island in the 1880s, working in sawmills and strawberry harvesting, and by the 1940s had become an integral part of the island's community.

Because of the island's proximity to naval bases, local Japanese Americans were the first in the whole country to be interned. 227 Japanese Americans were ordered to leave the island with six days' notice. They departed by ferry on March 30, 1942. The island had a total of 276 Japanese American residents at the time; those who were away from the island at the time due to study, military service, or other business were not permitted to return. Most internees were sent to Manzanar, California, though some were later transferred to Minidoka, Idaho. Local newspapers such as The Bainbridge Review (made famous by the novel and film Snow Falling on Cedars) spoke out against the internment and continued to publish correspondence from internees. A Seattle Post-Intelligencer photograph of Bainbridge Island resident Fumiko Hayashida and her 13-month-old daughter preparing to board the ferry that day became famous as a symbol of the internment. 150 returned to the island after the end of World War II. By 2011, about 90 survivors remained, of whom 20 still lived on the island.

The facility

The organizing group behind the facility, the Bainbridge Japanese American Community, planned to build a $9 million facility with a pier and  interpretive center, next to Pritchard Park and the former Bainbridge Island ferry terminal. Congress voted to include the memorial in the Minidoka National Historic Site in May 2008 as part of the Consolidated Natural Resources Act of 2008. By March 2009, memorial organizers had raised $2.7 million of funding.

The first part of the memorial to be constructed was an outdoor cedar "story wall" with the names of all 276 Japanese Americans resident on the island at the time. The groundbreaking ceremony for the wall was held on March 30, 2009, the 67th anniversary of the internment. Fumiko Hayashida (then 98), the oldest surviving internee, spoke at the ceremony. The wall was designed by local architect Johnpaul Jones, an American Indian and the principal of Jones and Jones Architects. Jones also worked on landscape architecture in the vicinity of the memorial; he aimed for natural landscaping, planting native species including sword fern, mahonia, salal, and shore pine. Local artist Steve Gardner created friezes to be placed on the wall, depicting some of the scenes of residents being herded onto the ferries; he stated that the project "sucked me in in a way I hadn't thought about. This really is a story about American citizens." The memorial was opened to the public on July 30, 2011.

See also
 Day of Remembrance (Japanese Americans)
 Densho: The Japanese American Legacy Project
 Empty Chair Memorial
 Fred Korematsu Day
 Go for Broke Monument
 Harada House
 Japanese American Memorial to Patriotism During World War II
 National Japanese American Veterans Memorial Court
 Sakura Square

References

External links

Bainbridge Island Japanese American Exclusion Memorial (BIJAEMA) official website
Bainbridge Island Japanese American Community (BIJAC)
Bainbridge Island Japanese American Exclusion Memorial Introduction, from BIJAC's website
Bainbridge Island - Japanese Memorial & Museum Exploring Bainbridge: Map, Tips & Information, Japanese-City

Bainbridge Island, Washington
Buildings and structures in Kitsap County, Washington
History of Kitsap County, Washington
Internment of Japanese Americans
Japanese-American memorials
Japanese-American culture in Washington (state)
Tourist attractions in Kitsap County, Washington